Bordj Okhriss is a town and commune in Bouïra Province, Algeria. As of the 1998 census it had a population of 8,937.

References

Communes of Bouïra Province
Bouïra Province